

Key

Selections

Notes
Duane Gunn was drafted in the 1984 Supplemental Draft.
Josh Brent was drafted in the 2010 NFL Supplemental Draft.

References

Indiana

Indiana Hoosiers NFL Draft